Rainy Lake 26C is a First Nations reserve in Rainy River District, Ontario. It is one of the reserves of the Nigigoonsiminikaaning First Nation.

References

External links
 Canada Lands Survey System

Saulteaux reserves in Ontario
Communities in Rainy River District